Boogie Board is a product line of paperless notaking tools, utilizing an LCD in conjunction with a stylus, finger, or other implement to replicate the functionality of pen and paper.

Boogie Board is developed by Kent Displays Incorporated, based on research conducted at Kent State University.

Technology

Boogie board is based on reflex display technology, i.e. LCDs that use cholesteric liquid crystal technology to reflect light in one state, and to be dark (non-reflecting) in the other state. The dark state occurs when no voltage is applied (voltage is needed to keep the light areas of the image reflecting).

Responsiveness has been compared to that of writing on paper. Drawings can be hard to see without illumination.

Battery lifespan is estimated at 50,000 erasures.

Digitization
Some higher end models add a digitization panel, allowing the user's input to be saved as a PDF. The board itself does not allow direct review of stored pages.

On models lacking internal digitization, capture is achieved through a smartphone camera using a Mobile app, though quality through this method is low.

Marketing
Boogie Boards are marketed as having uses like writing, drawing, and taking notes. Some models are designed to replicate the form factor of specific notetaking devices, such as the sticky note.

One model was released exclusively in Brookstone stores.

References

Tablet computers
Electronic paper technology